Kootumuchi Temple is a Hindu temple in Vellatanjoor of Thrissur District. The temple deity is a goddess called the Kootumuchikal Amma, considered to be the incarnation of Durga. 

Devi temples in Kerala
Hindu temples in Thrissur district
Durga temples